Dean Jarvis (born 1 June 1992) is a Northern Irish footballer who plays for Coleraine as a left back.

Club career

After playing youth football in his native Northern Ireland for Ballymoor and Derry City, Jarvis made his professional debut for Aberdeen in the Scottish Premier League on 2 October 2010. It remained his only appearance for the club, as Jarvis was released in April 2011.

He returned to his native Northern Ireland, signing for Institute in August 2011.

Jarvis re-signed for his hometown club Derry City in July 2013 after a trial with York City.

Following the end of his contract with Derry City, he moved on to Dundalk in January 2018, after signing in November 2017. He left Dundalk at the end of the 2019 season.

In December 2019 it was announced he would sign for Larne in January 2020.

Jarvis signed for Coleraine in June 2022.

International career
Jarvis has represented Northern Ireland at youth international level.

Honours
Dundalk
League of Ireland Premier Division: 2018, 2019
FAI Cup: 2018
League of Ireland Cup: 2019
President's Cup: 2019
Champion's Cup: 2019 

Larne
County Antrim Shield: 2020–21, 2021-22

References

1992 births
Living people
Association footballers from Northern Ireland
Northern Ireland under-21 international footballers
Derry City F.C. players
League of Ireland players
Sportspeople from Derry (city)
Aberdeen F.C. players
Institute F.C. players
Scottish Premier League players
NIFL Premiership players
Dundalk F.C. players
Larne F.C. players
Association football fullbacks
Coleraine F.C. players